William Henry Dieterich (March 31, 1876October 12, 1940) was an American lawyer and Democratic politician from Illinois. He was a state legislator, U.S. Representative, and  U.S. Senator

Biography 
He was born near Cooperstown, Illinois. After graduating from Kennedy Business College in 1897 and Northern Indiana Law School in 1901, Dieterich was admitted to the bar and began to practice in Rushville, Illinois. During the Spanish–American War, he served as a corporal.

He was city attorney for Rushville, 1903–1907; treasurer of Rushville Union Schools 1906–1908; and county judge of Schuyler County, 1906–1910.

In 1911 he moved to Chicago, and then in 1912 to Beardstown, Illinois, in Cass County, adjacent to Schuyler, where he continued his law practice.

In 1916, he was elected to the Illinois House of Representatives, and re-elected in 1918, serving from 1917 to 1921.

In 1930, he was elected U.S. Representative from one of Illinois' two at-large seats, finishing ahead of both Republicans and the other Democrat. He served only one term.

In 1932, he declined re-nomination to the House, and instead ran for U.S. Senator. He defeated incumbent Republican Otis Glenn 52% to 46%.

He served one term, from 1933 to 1939. He did not run for re-election in 1938, instead returning to his law practice. He died in Springfield, Illinois during a business trip.

References

External links
 
 

1876 births
1940 deaths
Illinois state court judges
Democratic Party members of the Illinois House of Representatives
Democratic Party United States senators from Illinois
People from Brown County, Illinois
Democratic Party members of the United States House of Representatives from Illinois
People from Rushville, Illinois
Military personnel from Illinois